The Brothers: John Foster Dulles, Allen Dulles, and Their Secret World War  is a 2013 book by the New York Times journalist and historian, Stephen Kinzer. It has been described as "a riveting chronicle of government-sanctioned murder, casual elimination of “inconvenient” regimes, relentless prioritization of American corporate interests and cynical arrogance on the part of two men who were once among the most powerful in the world." Kinzer traces how the activity of Dulles brothers "helped set off some of the world's most profound long-term crises." It is a based on secondary sources.

Background
President Dwight Eisenhower gave the position of secretary of state to John Foster Dulles and the position of director of the CIA to Allen Dulles in 1953. It was for the first and only time in history.

Context
The book mentions that Dulles play a vital role in leading the US into the Vietnam War, and assisting to overthrow cold governments such as Guatemala, Iran, the Congo, and Indonesia.

The book's first several chapters give information about the family background, childhoods, and college educations of the two brothers. In this way, some points of their personal life are provided: Foster was a devoted wife and Allen was an unfaithful husband. Kinzer explains how the actions of the Dulles brothers aimed at removing world leaders whom they considered dangerous to the American interests. They brother had a significant effect on the United States foreign policy and global conflicts.

The book mentions "six monsters" that the "Dulles brothers believed had to be brought down": Mohammed Mossadegh in Iran, Jacobo Árbenz in Guatemala, Ho Chi Minh in Vietnam, Sukarno in Indonesia, Patrice Lumumba in the Congo, and Fidel Castro in Cuba.  Ho Chi Minh and Castro espoused left-wing politics. The other leaders on the list were nationalists who campaigned for their country's independence. The book also discusses Iran at length. While explaining the careers of the brothers, Kinzer describes events from American history such as mind-control experiments “in which psychoactive drugs were administered to unknowing victims.”

See also
 Poisoner in Chief

References

External links
Q&A interview with Kinzer on The Brothers, November 3, 2013, C-SPAN
Presentation by Kinzer on The Brothers, October 4, 2013, C-SPAN

Political books
Books by Stephen Kinzer
2013 non-fiction books
Dulles family